The Trans-European Transport Network Executive Agency (TEN-T EA) was an executive agency established by the European Commission in October 2006 in order to realise the technical and financial implementation of the TEN-T programme. It ceased its activities on 31 December 2013 and was superseded by the Innovation and Networks Executive Agency (INEA).

The Agency was in charge of all open TEN-T projects under the 2000-2006 and 2007-2013 funding schemes. The projects represent all transport modes – air, rail, road, and maritime/sea – plus logistics and intelligent transport systems, and involve all EU Member States.

Its status as an executive agency meant that, although independent, the TEN-T EA was closely linked with its parent, the Directorate-General for Mobility and Transport (DG MOVE). DG MOVE dealt with all policy-making issues related to the TEN-T programme, while the Agency existed to execute the programme's specific tasks with a limited duration (31 December 2015).

References 

Agencies of the European Union
2006 establishments in Belgium
2006 in the European Union
Government agencies established in 2006
International organisations based in Belgium
Trans-European Transport Network